Kocioł may refer to the following places in Poland:
Kocioł, Lower Silesian Voivodeship (south-west Poland)
Kocioł, Warmian-Masurian Voivodeship (north Poland)